Annin & Smith (c. 1818-1837) was an engraving firm in Boston, Massachusetts, in the 19th century, established by William B. Annin and George Girdler Smith. The firm kept offices on Court Street and Cornhill.

References

Further reading

Works with engravings by Annin & Smith
 Jacob Bigelow. American medical botany: being a collection of the native medicinal plants of the United States. Boston: Cummings and Hilliard, 1817-1820. 3 volumes.
 John Locke, James Edward Smith. Outlines of botany: taken chiefly from Smith's Introduction; containing an explanation of botanical terms and an illustration of the system of Linnaeus. Also some account of natural orders, and the anatomy and physiology of vegetables; Illustrated by engravings. For the use of schools and students. Boston: Published by Cummings and Hilliard, 1819.
 Walter Scott. Tales of my landlord. Boston: Samuel H. Parker, no. 12, Cornhill, 1821. Drawn by William Allan.
 William Tudor. The life of James Otis of Massachusetts: containing also, notices of some contemporary characters and events from the year 1760 to 1775. Boston: Wells and Lilly, Court Street, 1823.
 Penmanship or the Beauties of Writing Exemplified in a Variety of Specimens Practical and ornamental, 4th ed. Boston: 1829.
 Asher Benjamin. The practical house carpenter: Being a complete development of the Grecian orders of architecture, methodised and arranged in such a simple, plain, and comprehensive manner, as to be easily understood... Boston: Published by the author, R.P. & C. Williams, and Annin & Smith, 1830. Reprint of 3rd ed. (1832)
 Boston writing copies. Boston: Carter and Hendee, corner of Washington and School Streets, 1833. Drawn by Barnabas Whitney.

Works about Annin & Smith
 Review of Bigelow's American Medical Botany, v.1 part 2, and v.2 part 1 (Boston: Cummings & Hillard, 1819). The North-American Review and Miscellaneous Journal, Vol. 9, No. 24 (June 1819), pp. 23–26.

Image gallery
Engravings by Annin & Smith

External links

 Boston Athenaeum. Works by Annin & Smith.

See also
 George Girdler Smith

1818 establishments in Massachusetts
19th century in Boston
Economic history of Boston
Cultural history of Boston
Financial District, Boston
American companies disestablished in 1837
American companies established in 1818 
Manufacturing companies disestablished in 1837
Manufacturing companies established in 1818
Manufacturing companies based in Boston
Engraving